Hail, Hero! is a 1969 drama film directed by David Miller, starring Michael Douglas, Deborah Winters and Peter Strauss.  David Manber wrote the screenplay based on the novel by John Weston. The picture was produced by Harold D. Cohen and was the feature film debut for Douglas and for Peter Strauss.

Plot
During the Vietnam War, college student Carl Dixon quits school and joins the Army in hopes of using love, not bullets, to combat the Viet Cong.

Cast
 Michael Douglas as Carl Dixon
 Arthur Kennedy as Albert Dixon, Carl's father
 Teresa Wright as Santha Dixon, Carl's mother
 Peter Strauss as Frank Dixon, Carl's younger brother
 John Larch as Mr. Conklin
 Charles Drake as Senator Murchiston
 Mercer Harris as Jimmy
 Deborah Winters as Becky
 John Qualen as Billy Hurd
 James Nusser as Max

Production
Gordon Lightfoot contributed two songs to the soundtrack, the title song (co-written with Jerome Moross) and "Wherefore And Why", an "alternate, slightly faster take" of the first track of Did She Mention My Name?  No soundtrack album was released.

A key scene in the film was changed shortly before the film's release. In both the novel and the film, "Carl spends his last night at home painting the side of his father's barn with a Pop war mural—flowers, bombs, flaming planes and an American flag in which hearts have replaced the stars. In the novel (and in the film before it was ... re-edited), Carl's mother ... and father joined him in this act of affirmation."

Reception
For his performance, Michael Douglas was nominated for Golden Globe Award for New Star of the Year – Actor.

Upon the film's October 1969 release, Vincent Canby wrote:
In Hail, Hero! you can see Kirk Douglas, even younger than he was in The Champion in 1949, in the person of his 25-year-old son, Michael. This new Douglas has his father's extraordinary, Fearless Fosdick jaw, the suggestion of his dimpled chin and the cool, gentle eyes. He also possesses the almost manic, physical buoyancy that compels attention even when it bears little relation to the circumstances in which the actor finds himself. It's not an especially memorable performance, but it's an energetic one, and without Douglas, Hail, Hero! would not even be tolerable.

In a retrospective review TV Guide called it a "talky, uninspired attempt to bring 60s-style 'relevance' to the screen."

See also
 List of American films of 1969

References

External links

 
 
 
 

1969 films
1969 drama films
American drama films
Anti-war films about the Vietnam War
Cinema Center Films films
Films based on American novels
Films directed by David Miller
Films scored by Jerome Moross
1960s English-language films
1960s American films